World War 3 was an annual professional wrestling pay-per-view event produced by World Championship Wrestling (WCW). The pay-per-view's title also was the name of its signature match, a three-ring, sixty-man battle royal. The event took place every November from 1995 until 1998. Like the Royal Rumble, the World War 3 match was held at the event that shared its name. The first two World War 3 events were held at the Norfolk Scope and the last two were held at The Palace of Auburn Hills. In 1999, it was replaced by Mayhem.

WWE owns the rights of World War 3 since the sale of WCW and its trademarks in 2001. In February 2021, all WCW pay-per-views were made available on the WWE Network.

Rules
The rules for a World War 3 match were similar to the rules for a traditional battle royal match:

All sixty men were randomly assigned a specific ring before the match began.
The match began with all sixty men, in three rings, when the bell rings. Each ring was assigned a number. From left-to-right on the TV screen ring #1 was on the left, ring #2 was the center ring and ring #3 was on the right.
Originally, in order to be eliminated from the match a wrestler had to be thrown over the top rope and have both feet touch the floor. This rule was amended in 1997 to allow for eliminations if a person leaves the ring in any way. In 1998 the rule was amended again to allow the counting of pinfalls and submissions for eliminations.
When 10 men remained in ring #1 or ring #3 they moved to ring #2 and the match continued.
This rule was amended in 1997 so that the competitors had to move to the central ring once forty men had been eliminated.
The last man standing in the ring was declared the winner.

The inaugural World War 3 match was contested for the WCW World Heavyweight Championship, which had been stripped from The Giant due to the outcome of his match with Hulk Hogan at Halloween Havoc in October 1995. In subsequent years the winner of the match became the #1 contender to the World Heavyweight Championship. Initially the winner got to pick which pay-per-view he would face the champion at, but this changed for the 1997 and 1998 matches to a set pay-per-view.

Dates, venues, winners, and main events

Championship match for winner
 – Championship victory
 – Championship match loss

Date discrepancy on VHS packaging
WCW released the World War 3 events on home video the following year, with the packaging for the first three releases reflecting the year that the video was released and not the year that the actual event took place, e.g. the 1995 broadcast of World War 3 was released on VHS as World War 3 '96. The cover for the 1999 release of the final 1998 event did not show a date.

Offshoots
On the July 1, 2022 episode of AEW Rampage, All Elite Wrestling held its first Royal Rampage match, which would include a battle royal involving more than one ring, in this case two rings, and 20 competitors, with the winner one contender for the AEW World Heavyweight Championship.

References

 
Recurring events established in 1995
Recurring events disestablished in 1998